Lac de Viremont is a small lake near the village of Viremont, at Légna in the Jura department of France. It lies at a height of 656 m, and offers 2ha of waters. It lies amidst a larger fen area and was erected as a ZNIEFF.

Sources
http://inpn.mnhn.fr/zone/znieff/430007774?lg=en (consulted 2013/08/15)

Viremont